William Owen Cowger (January 1, 1922 – October 2, 1971), a Republican, served as mayor of Louisville, Kentucky, and as a member of the United States House of Representatives.

Life
Cowger was born in Hastings, Nebraska.  He moved to Louisville, Kentucky to study political science at the University of Louisville.  After other graduate work and military service in World War II,  he returned to Louisville and became president of a mortgage loan company.  In 1961, Cowger was elected mayor of Louisville for a single four-year term. (State law at the time did not allow him to seek re-election.) Cowger was then elected to the United States House of Representatives in 1966 and served in the House of Representatives from January 3, 1967, to January 3, 1971. Cowger voted in favor of the Civil Rights Act of 1968. Cowger unsuccessfully sought re-election in 1970 while dealing with a fatal illness, but was defeated by Democrat Romano L. Mazzoli.  After his defeat, Cowger returned to his mortgage business in Louisville and died less than one year after. He is buried in Cave Hill Cemetery in Louisville.

References

External links

1922 births
1971 deaths
Mayors of Louisville, Kentucky
Military personnel from Louisville, Kentucky
People from Hastings, Nebraska
Burials at Cave Hill Cemetery
Republican Party members of the United States House of Representatives from Kentucky
20th-century American politicians
American military personnel of World War II